Lamar Divens (born November 12, 1985) is an American football nose tackle who is currently a free agent. 

He played college football first at Vanderbilt, but later transferred to Tennessee State. 

He was signed by the San Diego Chargers as an undrafted free agent in 2008. His five appearances in National Football League games were all with the Baltimore Ravens: three in 2008 and two in 2010. He was also a member of the Tampa Bay Buccaneers practice squad in 2011. Divens spent the 2012 offseason with the Tennessee Titans, but did not make the team when they cut down to 53 players for the regular season. He then spent the 2013 offseason with the San Francisco 49ers before getting injured and being released with an injury settlement.

References

External links
San Francisco 49ers bio
Baltimore Ravens bio

1985 births
Living people
People from Fayetteville, Tennessee
Players of American football from Tennessee
American football defensive tackles
Tennessee State Tigers football players
San Diego Chargers players
Baltimore Ravens players
Tampa Bay Buccaneers players
Tennessee Titans players